Peter Joppich (born 21 December 1982) is a German foil fencer.

Biography
Joppich is a five-time World Champion in Foil with four Individual titles and one Team title. He won the gold medal in 2010 World Fencing Championships after beating Lei Sheng 15–11 at Championnats du Monde, Paris. He was also the winner of the World Fencing Championships in St Petersburg in 2007 after beating Andrea Baldini 15–9, Turin in 2006 after beating Baldini 15–14, and Havana in 2003. He won his first World Championship Individual Title when he was just 21 years old.

Joppich credits his success to former German fencer and Olympic gold medallist Ulrich Schreck. For more than 10 years, Schreck instructed Joppich during the latter's training at the Federal Training Centre in Bonn. He has competed in five Olympic Games – Athens 2004, Beijing 2008, London 2012, Rio de Janeiro 2016, and Tokyo 2021. He finished sixth, fifth, eleventh, and twelfth respectively.

References

External links
FIE Record of Peter Joppich
Peter Joppich wins 4th World Championship
Official FIE Records
Peter Joppich's Interview by MH
Schnelle Klinge, heller Kopf Markus Wessel / WDR.de

1982 births
Living people
German male fencers
German foil fencers
Fencers at the 2004 Summer Olympics
Fencers at the 2008 Summer Olympics
Fencers at the 2012 Summer Olympics
Fencers at the 2016 Summer Olympics
Olympic fencers of Germany
Olympic bronze medalists for Germany
Olympic medalists in fencing
Medalists at the 2012 Summer Olympics
Fencers at the 2020 Summer Olympics
Sportspeople from Rhineland-Palatinate